Mojisola Oluwa (born 27 March 1973 is a Nigerian weightlifter. He competed at the 1996 Summer Olympics in the men's 70 kg event He won the men's 70 kg event at the 1994 Commonwealth Games

Major Results

References

External links
 

1973 births
Living people
Nigerian male weightlifters
Olympic weightlifters of Nigeria
Weightlifters at the 1996 Summer Olympics
Commonwealth Games gold medallists for Nigeria
Weightlifters at the 1994 Commonwealth Games
Commonwealth Games medallists in weightlifting
African Games silver medalists for Nigeria
African Games medalists in weightlifting
Competitors at the 1995 All-Africa Games
20th-century Nigerian people
21st-century Nigerian people
Medallists at the 1994 Commonwealth Games